Leif Hansen (born 16 February 1955) is a Danish former footballer who played as a defender. He made four appearances for the Denmark national team in 1983.

References

External links
 
 

1955 births
Living people
Danish men's footballers
Association football defenders
Denmark international footballers
Esbjerg fB players
Kolding IF players